Assié-Koumassi is a town in east-central Ivory Coast. It is a sub-prefecture of Bongouanou Department in Moronou Region, Lacs District.

Assié-Koumassi was a commune until March 2012, when it became one of 1126 communes nationwide that were abolished.

In 2014, the population of the sub-prefecture of Assié-Koumassi was 15,542.

Villages
The 6 villages of the sub-prefecture of Assié-Koumassi and their population in 2014 are:
 Assié-Assasso (2 465)
 Assié-Kokoré (2 078)
 Assié-Kouamékro (254)
 Assié-Koumassi (8 375)
 Assié-Koyékro (2 186)
 Assié-Méakro (184)

References

Sub-prefectures of Moronou Region
Former communes of Ivory Coast